Parkland Elementary School may refer to:

Parkland Elementary School (Coquitlam)
Parkland Elementary School (Farmington)
Parkland Elementary School (Quesnel)
Parkland Elementary School (Louisville, Kentucky)